Frank Fox (born ) is a former professional rugby league footballer who played in the 1960s and 1970s.

Playing career

Challenge Cup Final appearances
Frank Fox was an unused interchange/substitute in Castleford’s 11-6 victory over Salford in the 1968–69 Challenge Cup Final during the 1968–69 season at Wembley Stadium, London on Saturday 17 May 1969, in front of a crowd of 97,939.

County Cup Final appearances
Frank Fox played left-, i.e. number 8, in Halifax's 10-0 victory over Featherstone Rovers in the 1963–64 Yorkshire County Cup Final during the 1963–64 season at Belle Vue, Wakefield on Saturday 2 November 1963, in front of a crowd of 13,238, and played left-, i.e. number 8, in Hull Kingston Rovers' 25-12 victory over Featherstone Rovers in the 1966–67 Yorkshire County Cup Final during the 1966–67 season at Headingley Rugby Stadium, Leeds on Saturday 15 October 1966, in front of a crowd of 13,241.

Club career
Frank Fox made his dêbut for Castleford against Wakefield Trinity at Belle Vue, Wakefield on Saturday 19 August 1967, and he played his last match for Castleford against Hull F.C. at Wheldon Road, Castleford on Tuesday 31 March 1970.

References

External links
Search for "Fox" at rugbyleagueproject.org
"Frank Fox" Memory Box Search at archive.castigersheritage.com
Search for "Frank Fox" at britishnewspaperarchive.co.uk

Living people
Castleford Tigers players
English rugby league players
Halifax R.L.F.C. players
Hull Kingston Rovers players
Place of birth missing (living people)
Rugby league props
Year of birth missing (living people)
Yorkshire rugby league team players